A total solar eclipse will occur at the Moon's descending node of the orbit on Wednesday, August 12, 2026, 2 days past perigee (Perigee on Monday, August 10, 2026), in North America and Europe. The total eclipse will pass over the Arctic, Greenland, Iceland, Atlantic Ocean and northern Spain. The points of greatest duration and greatest eclipse will be just 45 km off the western coast of Iceland by 65°10.3' N and 25°12.3' W, where the totality will last 2m 18.21s. 
It will be the first total eclipse visible in Iceland since June 30, 1954, also Solar Saros series 126 (descending node), and the only one to occur in the 21st century as the next one will be in 2196.

Occurring only 2.3 days after perigee (Perigee on August 10, 2026), the Moon's apparent diameter will be larger. Lunar Perigee will occur on Monday, August 10, 2026, two days before the total solar eclipse.

The total eclipse will pass over northern Spain from the Atlantic coast to the Mediterranean coast as well as the Balearic Islands. The total eclipse will be visible from the cities of Valencia, Zaragoza, Palma and Bilbao but both Madrid and Barcelona will be just outside the path of totality.

The last total eclipse in continental Europe occurred on March 29, 2006 and in continental part of European Union it occurred on August 11, 1999.
The last total solar eclipse happened in Spain on August 30, 1905 and followed a similar path across the country. The next total eclipse visible in Spain will happen less than a year later on 2 August 2027. A partial eclipse will cover more than 90% of the area of the sun in Ireland, Great Britain, Portugal, France, Italy, the Balkans and North Africa and to a lesser extent in most of Europe, North Africa and North America.

Circumstances 
The eclipse path proceeds from North Siberia throughout the Arctic Region, Iceland, eastern Atlantic to Spain and Mediterranean.

Solar eclipse and the aurora borealis 
In the North Russia area where totality will begin at sunrise, the aurora borealis could also be visible up to the beginning of the nautical twilight, depending on the intensity of the auroral activity at that date. If an extremely high intensity geomagnetic storm takes place simultaneously, there might be chances of seeing the aurora simultaneously with the eclipsed sun. In the east of Taymyr Peninsula the total phase will start at August 13 at 0:00 local time during midnight sun.

Solar eclipse below the horizon 
Due to the considerable eclipse magnitude (more than 0,8), observers where the totally eclipsed sun is just below the horizon will have the chance to observe the lunar shadow in the high atmosphere, as well as shortened civil twilight and extended nautical twilight. The darkening of the twilight sky could improve the chances of observing the inner Zodiacal light.

Images 
Animated path

Related eclipses

Eclipses in 2026
 An annular solar eclipse on February 17.
 A total lunar eclipse on March 3.
 A total solar eclipse on August 12.
 A partial lunar eclipse on August 28.

Solar eclipses 2026–2029

Saros 126

Metonic series

References

External links 

http://eclipse.gsfc.nasa.gov/SEplot/SEplot2001/SE2026Aug12T.GIF
https://eclipse.gsfc.nasa.gov/SEpath/SEpath2001/SE2026Aug12Tpath.html

2026 in science
2026 8 12
2026 8 12